Neno is a Croatian and Serbian given name of Slavic origin that is a diminutive form of Nenad in Croatia and Serbia.  It is also a nickname and surname.

Nickname
Neno (footballer, born 1962), Portuguese professional footballer
Neno (footballer, born 1988), professional Brazilian football player
Neno Belan (born 1962), Croatian musician
Neno Ašćerić, (born 1965), Serbian–Austrian basketball coach and player
Nazzareno Zamperla, also known as Neno Zamperla, (born 1937), Italian actor and stuntman

Given name
Neno DaPrato (1893 – 1984) was an American gridiron football player
Neno Katulić (born 1975), Croatian footballer
Neno Mirchev (1909 – ???), Bulgarian gymnast
Neno Nenov (Bulgarian: Нено Ненов) (born 14 June 1972) is a former Bulgarian footballer 
Neno Kolev Nenovsky (1934 – 2004), Bulgarian judge
Neno Terziyski (born 1964), Bulgarian weightlifter

Surname
Emmanuel Neno (born 1957), Pakistani author

See also

Niño (name)
Nino (name)
Nena (given name)
Nuño
Nuno (given name)
Nunn (surname)
Neko (disambiguation)
Nelo (disambiguation)
Nemo (disambiguation)
Nene (disambiguation)
Neo (disambiguation)
Neon (disambiguation)
Nero (disambiguation)
Neto (disambiguation)

Notes

Croatian masculine given names
Serbian masculine given names